Springfield Township is a township in Union County, in the U.S. state of New Jersey. The township is located on a ridge in northern-central New Jersey, within the Raritan Valley and Rahway Valley regions in the New York metropolitan area. As of the 2020 United States census, the township's population was 17,178, the highest recorded at any decennial census, an increase of 1,361 (+8.6%) from the 2010 census count of 15,817, which in turn reflected an increase of 1,388 (+9.6%) from the 14,429 counted in the 2000 census. 

Springfield was formed as a township on April 14, 1794, from portions of Elizabeth Township and Newark Township, while the area was still part of Essex County, and was incorporated as one of New Jersey's first 104 townships by an act of the New Jersey Legislature on February 21, 1798. It became part of the newly formed Union County on March 19, 1857, with portions remaining in Essex County used to create Millburn. Other portions of the township have been taken to form New Providence Township (November 8, 1809, now known as Berkeley Heights), Livingston (February 5, 1813), Summit (March 23, 1869) and Cranford (March 14, 1871). The township's name derives from springs and brooks in the area.

The Battle of Springfield was fought here, the last of many battles of the American Revolutionary War to be fought in New Jersey.

Springfield is the home of the Baltusrol Golf Club, which was the host to the 2016 PGA Championship. It has also hosted other golf major championships, including the U.S. Open, held on seven occasions at Baltusrol, most recently in 1993.  Golfweek magazine ranked Baltusrol as the 36th best in its 2010 rankings of the "Best Classic Courses" in the country.

New Jersey Monthly magazine ranked Springfield as the 85th best place to live in New Jersey in its 2010 rankings of the "Best Places To Live" in New Jersey.

History

Springfield is celebrated as the site of a Battle of Springfield between the American Continental Army and British forces on June 23, 1780. The British, under Hessian General Wilhelm von Knyphausen, advanced from Elizabethtown about 5 o'clock in the morning. They were opposed by General Nathanael Greene, but owing to the superior number of the enemy he was compelled to evacuate Springfield, which was then burned by the British. During the action the Rev. James Caldwell, chaplain in the New Jersey brigade, is said to have distributed the Watts hymn books from the neighboring Presbyterian Church among the soldiers for wadding, saying at the same time, "Now put Watts into them, boys." This battle prevented further advance on the part of the British. The American loss was about 15 and that of the British about 150.

Some historical landmarks from the Revolution still stand: the Cannon Ball House, which has since been converted into a museum, was (according to the township's official website) "Built circa 1741 and served as a farmhouse at the time of the Revolutionary War. During the Battle of Springfield (June 23, 1780) the British used it as a hospital. ... It was one of only three buildings left standing when all others including the Presbyterian Church where Reverend James Caldwell had taken Watts hymnbooks for rifle wadding, were set on fire. ... In later years the house became a tavern to serve travelers on Morris (Ave) Turnpike. The farmland was later sold off, and it served then as a private residence. The property was acquired by the Springfield Historical Society in 1955. It has become known as The Cannon Ball House because a cannonball was found on the west side embedded in a beam. ... The Cannon Ball House has five revolutionary era rooms, some American Civil War items, early tools, a Battle diorama and a colonial garden. It has just been (1998) renovated to its original appearance and color."

After being burned down by the British, First Presbyterian Church was rebuilt. A statue of a Continental soldier was erected in 1903 at the site of the smallest state park in New Jersey.

Geography
According to the United States Census Bureau, the township had a total area of 5.17 square miles (13.40 km2), including 5.16 square miles (13.36 km2) of land and 0.02 square miles (0.04 km2) of water (0.31%).

The Township of Springfield is located on the northern edge of Union County and is bordered by Millburn to the north in Essex County, by Union Township to the east, by Kenilworth to the southeast, by Westfield and Cranford to the south, by Mountainside to the southwest and by Summit to the northwest.

Unincorporated communities, localities and place names located partially or completely within the township include Baltusrol, Branch Mills and Milltown.

Parks and recreation
The Rahway River Parkway greenway along the Rahway River runs through the township.

Parks include:
Briant Park, which crosses into Summit

Demographics

2010 census

The Census Bureau's 2006–2010 American Community Survey showed that (in 2010 inflation-adjusted dollars) median household income was $84,038 (with a margin of error of +/− $8,139) and the median family income was $111,359 (+/− $8,121). Males had a median income of $74,335 (+/− $7,959) versus $62,859 (+/− $6,250) for females. The per capita income for the township was $46,393 (+/− $3,175). About 2.9% of families and 6.0% of the population were below the poverty line, including 1.9% of those under age 18 and 5.6% of those age 65 or over.

2000 census
As of the 2000 United States census there were 14,429 people, 6,001 households, and 4,014 families residing in the township. The population density was 2,801.8 people per square mile (1,081.8/km2). There were 6,204 housing units at an average density of 1,204.7 per square mile (465.1/km2). The racial makeup of the township was 89.72% White, 3.72% African American, 0.02% Native American, 4.69% Asian, 0.96% from other races, and 0.89% from two or more races. Hispanic or Latino people of any race were 4.14% of the population.

There were 6,001 households, out of which 27.0% had children under the age of 18 living with them, 56.9% were married couples living together, 7.3% had a female householder with no husband present, and 33.1% were non-families. 28.7% of all households were made up of individuals, and 14.7% had someone living alone who was 65 years of age or older. The average household size was 2.40 and the average family size was 2.98.

In the township the population was spread out, with 20.6% under the age of 18, 4.7% from 18 to 24, 29.4% from 25 to 44, 24.7% from 45 to 64, and 20.6% who were 65 years of age or older. The median age was 42 years. For every 100 females, there were 89.3 males. For every 100 females age 18 and over, there were 86.0 males.

The median income for a household in the township was $73,790, and the median income for a family was $85,725. Males had a median income of $55,907 versus $39,542 for females. The per capita income for the township was $36,754. About 1.8% of families and 3.1% of the population were below the poverty line, including 1.0% of those under age 18 and 5.8% of those age 65 or over.

Government

Local government
The Township of Springfield is governed under the Township form of New Jersey municipal government, one of 141 municipalities (of the 564) statewide that use this form, the second-most commonly used form of government in the state. The Township Committee is comprised of five members, who are elected directly by the voters at-large in partisan elections to serve three-year terms of office on a staggered basis, with either one or two seats coming up for election each year as part of the November general election in a three-year cycle. At an annual reorganization meeting, usually held on the first day of January, the committee selects one of its members to serve as Mayor and another as Deputy Mayor.

, members of the Springfield Township Committee members are Mayor Christopher Capodice (D, term on committee ends December 31, 2023; term as mayor ends 2023), Deputy Mayor Alex Keiser (D, term on committee ends 2024; term as deputy mayor ends 2023), Erica DuBois (D, 2025), Richard Huber (D, 2025), and Christopher Weber (D, 2024).

In the November 2012 general election, voters approved the formation of a Charter Study Commission that would consider the possibility of changing the existing township form of government and may recommend changing to one the forms available under the Faulkner Act (mayor-council, council-manager, small municipality or mayor-council-administrator), one of the other available forms or to leave the form of government unchanged.

Federal, state and county representation
Springfield Township is located in the 7th Congressional District and is part of New Jersey's 21st state legislative district.

 

Union County is governed by a Board of County Commissioners, whose nine members are elected at-large to three-year terms of office on a staggered basis with three seats coming up for election each year, with an appointed County Manager overseeing the day-to-day operations of the county. At an annual reorganization meeting held in the beginning of January, the board selects a Chair and Vice Chair from among its members. , Union County's County Commissioners are 
Chair Rebecca Williams (D, Plainfield, term as commissioner and as chair ends December 31, 2022), 
Vice Chair Christopher Hudak (D, Linden, term as commissioner ends 2023; term as vice chair ends 2022),
James E. Baker Jr. (D, Rahway, 2024),
Angela R. Garretson (D, Hillside, 2023),
Sergio Granados (D, Elizabeth, 2022),
Bette Jane Kowalski (D, Cranford, 2022), 
Lourdes M. Leon (D, Elizabeth, 2023),
Alexander Mirabella (D, Fanwood, 2024) and 
Kimberly Palmieri-Mouded (D, Westfield, 2024).
Constitutional officers elected on a countywide basis are
County Clerk Joanne Rajoppi (D, Union Township, 2025),
Sheriff Peter Corvelli (D, Kenilworth, 2023) and
Surrogate Susan Dinardo (acting).
The County Manager is Edward Oatman.

Politics
As of March 2011, there were a total of 10,078 registered voters in Springfield Township, of which 3,271 (32.5% vs. 41.8% countywide) were registered as Democrats, 1,795 (17.8% vs. 15.3%) were registered as Republicans and 5,007 (49.7% vs. 42.9%) were registered as Unaffiliated. There were 5 voters registered as Libertarians or Greens. Among the township's 2010 Census population, 63.7% (vs. 53.3% in Union County) were registered to vote, including 80.7% of those ages 18 and over (vs. 70.6% countywide).

In the 2012 presidential election, Democrat Barack Obama received 4,083 votes (55.3% vs. 66.0% countywide), ahead of Republican Mitt Romney with 3,179 votes (43.0% vs. 32.3%) and other candidates with 63 votes (0.9% vs. 0.8%), among the 7,388 ballots cast by the township's 10,772 registered voters, for a turnout of 68.6% (vs. 68.8% in Union County). In the 2008 presidential election, Democrat Barack Obama received 4,328 votes (53.9% vs. 63.1% countywide), ahead of Republican John McCain with 3,548 votes (44.2% vs. 35.2%) and other candidates with 82 votes (1.0% vs. 0.9%), among the 8,033 ballots cast by the township's 10,379 registered voters, for a turnout of 77.4% (vs. 74.7% in Union County). In the 2004 presidential election, Democrat John Kerry received 4,246 votes (55.1% vs. 58.3% countywide), ahead of Republican George W. Bush with 3,372 votes (43.8% vs. 40.3%) and other candidates with 49 votes (0.6% vs. 0.7%), among the 7,703 ballots cast by the township's 9,885 registered voters, for a turnout of 77.9% (vs. 72.3% in the whole county).

In the 2013 gubernatorial election, Republican Chris Christie received 57.0% of the vote (2,624 cast), ahead of Democrat Barbara Buono with 41.7% (1,921 votes), and other candidates with 1.3% (59 votes), among the 4,723 ballots cast by the township's 10,771 registered voters (119 ballots were spoiled), for a turnout of 43.8%. In the 2009 gubernatorial election, Republican Chris Christie received 2,477 votes (46.0% vs. 41.7% countywide), ahead of Democrat Jon Corzine with 2,447 votes (45.5% vs. 50.6%), Independent Chris Daggett with 359 votes (6.7% vs. 5.9%) and other candidates with 28 votes (0.5% vs. 0.8%), among the 5,380 ballots cast by the township's 10,214 registered voters, yielding a 52.7% turnout (vs. 46.5% in the county).

Education
The Springfield Public Schools serve students in pre-kindergarten through twelfth grade. As of the 2018–19 school year, the district, comprised of five schools, had an enrollment of 2,273 students and 167.5 classroom teachers (on an FTE basis), for a student–teacher ratio of 13.6:1. All of the township's schools are named after notable Springfieldians. For instance, the township's high school is named after Jonathan Dayton, a signer of the United States Constitution. Schools in the district (with 2018–19 enrollment data from the National Center for Education Statistics) are
Edward V. Walton Early Childhood Center with 627 students in grades Pre-K–2, 
James Caldwell Elementary School with 255 students in grades 3–5, 
Thelma L. Sandmeier Elementary School with 261 students in grades 3–5, 
Florence M. Gaudineer Middle School with 512 students in grades 6–8 and 
Jonathan Dayton High School with 578 students in grades 9–12.

Adjacent to Florence M. Gaudineer Middle School is Saint James the Apostle School, a Catholic school serving students in pre-kindergarten through eighth grades with an enrollment of 148 students, operating under the auspices of the Roman Catholic Archdiocese of Newark.

Transportation

Roads and highways

Interstate 78, U.S. Route 22, Route 24 and Route 124, as well as CR 509 Spur and CR 577, are among the highways and roadways that pass through Springfield Township.

Public transportation
NJ Transit provides bus service to the Port Authority Bus Terminal in Midtown Manhattan in New York City and to points in New Jersey including Newark Penn Station. Parking is available for a fee at a municipal lot near the center of town (Hannah Street and Center Street) and in the Duffy's Corner lot at Morris and Caldwell Place, which provide easy access to all NJ Transit buses that run through town. Annual permits are available from the town hall.

Although there is no train station in Springfield, the Millburn and Short Hills NJ Transit stations are located nearby, though neither allows commuter-hour parking for non-residents. The closest stations that allow out-of-town residents access to parking are Maplewood and Summit.  The 70 bus provides access from the center of town to NJ Transit's Summit and Millburn stations; Eastbound it terminates at NJ Transit's Newark Penn Station with connections to Amtrak, NJ Transit trains to New York Penn Station, and Port Authority Trans-Hudson (PATH) trains. The township also runs a jitney that operates on weekdays during morning and evening rush hours from the community pool to NJ Transit's Short Hills station. NJ Transit buses 65, 66 and 70 (to Newark), the 114 (to Midtown Manhattan's Port Authority Bus Terminal) and local service on the 52 route also run along the town's major roadways. Bus #114 runs at a frequency of 2-3 buses per hour during rush hour and 1 per hour outside of rush hour. 

Historical transportation
The Rahway Valley Railroad passed through the community, and during the early 20th century offered both freight and passenger service, but is currently out of service. The section of the railway that extended from Springfield to Summit was taken out of service in 1976, though special trains were operated to provide service to Baltusrol during the 1980 U.S. Open.

A trolley line called the Morris County Traction Company, ran trolley service through Springfield to/from Newark and Morris County, in the early part of the 20th century.

Notable people

People who were born in, residents of, or otherwise closely associated with Springfield Township include:

 Dan Avidan (born 1979), lead singer-songwriter of Ninja Sex Party, Shadow Academy and Starbomb; co-host of web series Game Grumps
 Lou Campanelli (born 1938), basketball coach
 William A. Chatfield (born 1951), government executive and lobbyist who served as the 11th Director of the Selective Service System, from 2004 to 2009
 Anthony Cioffi (born 1994), football safety; played college football for Rutgers University and was signed by the Oakland Raiders
 Jonas Coe (1805–1864), naval commander in Argentina and Uruguay
 Jon Denning (born 1987), NASCAR driver
 Jeannette DePalma (1956–1972), murder victim found in Houdaille Quarry whose unsolved case has become a matter of significant controversy thanks in part to coverage in Weird NJ magazine
 Ina Drew, former Chief Investment Officer at JP Morgan Chase who resigned following the 2012 JPMorgan Chase trading loss that resulted in billions in losses to the bank
 George A. Halsey (1827–1894), politician; represented New Jersey's 5th congressional district in Congress 1867–1869 and 1871–1873
 Toni Kalem (born 1951), actress, screenwriter and director; best known for her portrayal of Angie Bonpensiero on the HBO series The Sopranos
 Louis Keller (1857–1922), publisher, social arbiter of high society and golf club owner, best known as the founder of the Baltusrol Golf Club and as the first publisher of the Social Register
 Donald Lan (born 1930), politician; Secretary of State of New Jersey, 1977–1982
 George Low Jr. (1912–1995), professional golfer; better known as a putting instructor and hustler
 George Low Sr. (1874–1950), Scottish-American professional golfer who finished tied for second place in the 1899 U.S. Open championship
 Dina Matos (born 1966), former First Lady of New Jersey
 Gail J. McGovern (born 1952), businessperson who has served as President and CEO of the American Red Cross
 Mark Melni, pianist and inventor
 Curt Merz (born 1938), professional American football guard who played seven seasons in the American Football League for the Kansas City Chiefs
 Jackie Nese (born 1997), singer/songwriter, dancer, actor, who was a contestant on American Idol in 2015
 Dylan O'Brien (born 1991), actor
 Harry Pappas, politician who served on the Springfield Township Committee, has held posts in the Democratic and Republican parties in New Jersey and is a perennial candidate for public office
 Bernard Purdie (born 1941), prolific session drummer
 Claudio Reyna (born 1973), professional soccer player
 Jeff Ross (born 1965 as Jeffrey Ross Lifschultz), comedian
 George Erik Rupp (born 1942), former President of Rice University and Columbia University; has headed the International Rescue Committee since 2002
 Gabe Saporta (born 1979), lead singer and primary creative force behind the band Cobra Starship
 Joe Schaffernoth (born 1937), pitcher who played for the Chicago Cubs and Cleveland Indians
 Barbara Tropp (1948–2001), chef and cookery writer who helped introduce Americans to Chinese cuisine
 Zygi Wilf (born 1950), owner of the Minnesota Vikings
 James Yee (born ), former United States Army chaplain with the rank of captain; best known for being subject to an intense investigation by the United States, but all charges were later dropped

References

External links

 Official website

 
1794 establishments in New Jersey
Populated places established in 1794
Township form of New Jersey government
Townships in Union County, New Jersey